Água Creola is a village in Mé-Zóchi District on São Tomé Island in São Tomé and Príncipe. Its population is 203 (2012 census).

Population history

References

Populated places in Mé-Zóchi District